SCIE or scie may refer to:

 Shenzhen College of International Education
 Social Care Institute for Excellence
 Science Citation Index Expanded

See also
Scie (disambiguation)